Little Ghetto Boy is a cover song from Lalah Hathaway of her fathers' 1972 song Little Ghetto Boy featuring vocals from Snoop Dogg and Robert Glasper from her album Lalah Hathaway live. It released from eOne records on January 22, 2016.

Meaning

The song depicts the devastation of those underprivileged, while speaking about the courage and resilience in the state of struggle, inspiring one to rise above their circumstances.

Inspiration

Lalah Hathaway stated that the inspiration comes from her father, saying: "The truth of the song rings the same today as it did forty years ago. The fact that I can deliver this truth with the same conviction my father felt all those years ago is extraordinary."

Campaign

Hathaway formed a campaign for people to share art, music, poetry, sculptures, photos, etc.) inspired by the song.

Awards

The single won the 2016 Grammy Award for Best Traditional R&B Performance, while its parent album also received a Grammy a year later.

References

2015 songs
2016 songs
Donny Hathaway songs
Lalah Hathaway songs
Grammy Award for Best Traditional R&B Vocal Performance